Alaquàs is a municipality in the Horta Oest comarca in the Valencian Community.

Etymology
The town's name is of Arabic origin, coming from al-aquas (الأقواس), meaning "the arches", believed to be a reference to a bridge of Moorish origin near the town.

Heritage
Castillo-palacio de Alaquàs
Iglesia de la Asunción
Iglesia de Nuestra Señora del Olivar, also known as Església de la Mare de Déu de l'Olivar.

Economy
In 2008, Alaquàs was mainly employed in industry (45% of those) and services (53%). Agriculture, with just over 2% of those employed, is a residual sector. In the same year, there were 134 hectares of irrigated land, specifically dedicated to citrus (99 ha) and herbaceous crops (35 ha).

Specialization in bricks and jars gave way to the wood (furniture) industry, metal products manufacture and the food industry. The industrial land occupies about 160 ha, divided between El Bovalar (32 ha; west), Els Mollons and other isolated enclaves. The sectoral distribution of companies was: 59% in the industrial sector, 24% in business services, 9% in consumer services, 3% in agri-food and the remaining 5% in other services.

Local politics
Alaquàs is located in l'Horta, an area known as the red belt due to its tendency to vote for left wing parties. The Communist Party of Spain won most seats at the 1979 local election and remained strong in the area until the 1990s when they declined, losing their last seat at the 1995 elections. The People's Party received the most votes for the first time at the 2011 local elections.

Summary of council seats won

Source:

*Results for the Communist Party of Spain. In 1986 they joined with other parties to form the current United Left.

#In 1983, the People's Alliance (AP), Democratic Popular Party (PDP), Liberal Union (UL) and Valencian Union (UV) formed a four party electoral alliance. The electoral alliance ended in 1986 and the AP and UV contested the 1987 local elections separately. In 1989 the AP merged with the PDP and UL to form the current People's Party.

†Results for the Valencian People's Union, who later formed the Valencian Nationalist Bloc (BNV).

Climate

International relations

Twin towns – sister cities
Alaquàs is twinned with:

 Cremona, Italy
 Lanjarón, Province of Granada, Spain

Culture

Festivals
Village festivals (Held from the end of August to the beginning of September), which include, among others, the Correfocs, Moros y cristianos and El Canto de la Carxofa.
Fallas (Held on March). Alaquàs has 11 commissions and its own prizes.
Fiesta del Porrat (Celebrated in spring in honor of San Francisco de Paula)

International events
Festival de Rock de Alaquàs, also known as FRA.

Bordering towns

References

External links
Alaquàs council website

Municipalities in the Province of Valencia
Horta Oest